Marcel Cardoso Ribeiro (born 16 March 1990 in Visp) is a Portuguese footballer who plays for Académico Viseu as a winger.

References

External links

Stats and profile at LPFP 

1990 births
Living people
Portuguese footballers
Association football forwards
Liga Portugal 2 players
Académico de Viseu F.C. players